The 1860 Michigan gubernatorial election was held on November 6, 1860. Republican nominee Austin Blair defeated Democratic nominee John S. Barry with 56.69% of the vote.

General election

Candidates
Major party candidates
Austin Blair, Republican
John S. Barry, Democratic

Results

References

1860
Michigan
Gubernatorial
November 1860 events